The 4th government of Turkey (3 March 1925 – 1 November 1927) was a government in the history of Turkey. It is also called the third İnönü government.

Background 
The government was formed after the previous government led by Fethi Okyar fell following the Sheikh Said rebellion. The new prime minister was İsmet İnönü of the Republican People's Party (CHP), who was also the prime minister of the first two governments of Turkey

The government
In the list below, the cabinet members who served only a part of the cabinet's lifespan are shown in the column "Notes".

In 1925–1927, surnames were not in use in Turkey, which would remain true until the Surname Law. The surnames given in the list are the surnames the members of the cabinet assumed later.

Aftermath
On 1 November 1927, the president Mustafa Kemal Atatürk was elected for the third time, and according to custom, İsmet İnönü resigned and re-formed his government.

References

04
Republican People's Party (Turkey) politicians
1925 establishments in Turkey
1927 disestablishments in Turkey
Cabinets established in 1925
Cabinets disestablished in 1927
Members of the 4th government of Turkey
2nd parliament of Turkey
Republican People's Party (Turkey)